Tartu prison (Estonian: Tartu vangla) is a prison located in the Ropka industrial district suburb of Tartu in Estonia. The prison was designed by architect Kalle Glad, EstKONSULT and constructed by Skanska EMV. The prison was founded in 2000 with the first inmates arriving on 16 October 2002. The prison's total cost was €423 million, of which €365.8 million was construction costs. The total area is 93,763 m2.

Construction began after Parliament approved a €13,500,000 loan from Nordic Investment Bank.

In 2007, a drug-free center was opened in the prison. That same year the prison received an award from the World Health Organisation for its HIV-themed project.

The prison holds several war criminals including Dragomir Milošević, Milan Martić and Milan Lukić.

See also
Prisons in Estonia

References

External links
 
 

Prisons in Estonia
Buildings and structures in Tartu County
2000 establishments in Estonia